The E type Adelaide tram was a class of 20 bogie, half open, half closed combination trams with one drop and one straight sill end built by A Pengelly & Co, Adelaide in 1910 for the Municipal Tramways Trust (MTT). In 1918/19, all were remotored with 65 hp General Electric 201s with the original 50 hp General Electric 202s reused in the C type trams. When the MTT introduced an alpha classification system in 1923, they were designated the E type. In 1936, all were converted to E1s with crossbenches removed and the saloon extended along the full length.

Preservation
Two have been preserved:
111 & 118 by the Tramway Museum, St Kilda

References

Adelaide tram vehicles